Maiquetía "Simón Bolívar" International Airport is an international airport located in Maiquetía, Vargas, Venezuela, about  west of downtown Caracas, the capital of the country. Simply called  by the local population, it is the main international air passenger gateway to Venezuela. It handles flights to destinations in the Americas, Europe and the Middle East.

History 
The site had been recommended as an appropriate location for an airport by Charles Lindbergh on behalf of Pan Am. The USA subsidised the construction of the airport as part of the Airport Development Program. Luis Malaussena was the architect who designed the original passenger terminal.

It was regularly visited by the Anglo-French supersonic airliner Concorde until the 1980s. Commencing in the late 1970s, Air France operated weekly Concorde service between Caracas and Paris via a stop at Santa Maria Airport located in the Atlantic Ocean.

Lighting was installed on the runway and approach zones to allow night operations.

In the 1970s a new international terminal was constructed to offer increased capacity with a domestic terminal opening in 1983. Since 2000, the airport has been undergoing major changes in order to meet international standards and to improve passenger traffic, security, immigration areas, and customs areas. Security measures have become top priority since the September 11, 2001 attacks, and now departure areas and arrival areas are completely split into the lower and upper levels of the airport. The Proyecto Maiquetía 2000 (Project Maiquetia 2000) was completed in 2007 which added new customs and immigration areas, a new cargo terminal, and a connecting passageway between the domestic and international terminal.

As part of an expansion plan, new international gates are currently in construction, and a section of the parking area has been cleared to build an airport hotel. In the 1950s under the regime of Marcos Pérez Jiménez, road transport between the airport and the capital was improved by the inauguration of the Caracas-La Guaira highway.  However, the La Guaira and Caracas Railway, dating from the nineteenth century, was closed. In May 2007 a maglev train was proposed to link Caracas to La Guaira and Simón Bolívar International Airport. In light of the crisis in Venezuela since 2010, the maglev train is not expected to be operational soon. In 2016, the old jetways in the international terminal were replaced with new glass-walled jetways.

Crisis in Venezuela 
 

During the ongoing crisis in Bolivarian Venezuela, domestic airlines are laboring under tremendous difficulties because of hyperinflation and parts shortages. Many international airlines have left the country. International airlines that have left Venezuela include Aeroméxico, Aerolíneas Argentinas, Air Canada, Alitalia, Avianca, Delta Air Lines, Lufthansa, LATAM, and United Airlines, making travel to the country difficult. According to the International Air Transport Association (IATA), the Bolivarian government has not paid US$3.8 billion to international airlines in a currency issue involving conversion of local currency to U.S. dollars. Airlines have left for other reasons, including crime against flight crews, stolen baggage, and problems with the quality of jet fuel and maintenance of runways.

Following the increasing economic partnership between Venezuela and Turkey in October 2016, Turkish Airlines started offering direct flights from December 2016 connecting between Caracas to Istanbul (via Havana, Cuba) in an effort to "link and expand contacts" between the two countries.

By 2018, terminals in the airport lacked air conditioning and utilities such as water and electricity. Flight crews are often sent to different cities to avoid crime that occurs in the area. The company charged with providing sanitation services ceased to exist, so cleaning no longer occurs as frequently at the facility. The Bolivarian National Guard, tasked with providing security, often extorts travelers by force.

In support of President Nicolas Maduro's government, Russian Air Force aircraft, including Tupolev Tu-160 bombers, were deployed to the airport in early December 2018. In March 2019, two Russian planes were deployed to the airport carrying 100 troops and 35 tonnes of matériel. The Russian planes left the country 3 months later on 26 June 2019, according to the Russian embassy announcement.

American Airlines, the last U.S. airline serving Venezuela, left on 15 March 2019, after its pilots refused to fly to Venezuela, citing safety issues. Two months later, the United States Department of Transportation and Department of Homeland Security indefinitely suspended all flights between Venezuela and the United States, due to safety and security concerns. The suspension affects mainly Venezuelan airlines that flew to Miami: Avior Airlines, LASER Airlines, and Estelar Latinoamerica.

Iranian airline Mahan Air (blacklisted by the U.S. government since 2011) began direct flights to Caracas in April 2019, "signifying a growing relationship between the two nations". This route was later terminated.

Following the COVID-19 pandemic, the government announced on 3 February 2020 that the country has imposed epidemiological surveillance, restrictions and diagnostic systems to detect possible COVID-19 cases at this airport and that Venezuela will receive a diagnostic kit for the virus strain from the Pan American Health Organization (PAHO).

Airlines and destinations

Passenger 

The following airlines operate regular scheduled passenger flights at Simón Bolívar International Airport:

Cargo

Chronology of former international flights 

Since 2014, foreign and domestic carriers have reduced and/or terminated their presence due to political instability and their inability to recover US$3.8 billion in funds owed to airlines. For fear of safety, some carriers have avoided overnight flight crews in Caracas, choosing to make a stop in a nearby country instead. The chronology of terminations is as follows:

Statistics

Other facilities 
From 1960 to 1997, it was the main hub for Viasa, Venezuela's former flag carrier until it went bankrupt in January 1997. It was also the hub for Avensa, Servivensa. Conviasa started operation in 2004, hoping to become in a big and leader airline, and flag carrier. However, due to financial crisis in Venezuela, several pilots quit and are leaving Conviasa in order to fly to other nations like Turkey which operates the same type of aircraft. The headquarters of Conviasa is located on the airport grounds.

Accidents and incidents 
 On 27 November 1956, Linea Aeropostal Flight 253, a Lockheed Constellation, crashed while on final approach to Caracas Airport. All 25 passengers and crew on board were killed.
 On 12 December 1968, Pan Am Flight 217, crashed while on approach to Caracas. All 51 passengers and crew on board were killed.
 On 3 December 1969, Air France Flight 212 crashed shortly after takeoff from Simón Bolívar International Airport. All 62 passengers and crew on board were killed.
 On 3 November 1980, a Latin Carga Convair CV-880 crashed on take-off from the airport, resulting in the deaths of 4 occupants, and total destruction of the aircraft. The aircraft involved, registration YV-145C, had flown from 1962 to January 1974 for Delta Air Lines of the United States and was retired by that airline, then sold to Latin Carga in 1979.
 On 16 October 2008, a RUTACA Airlines Boeing 737 went out of the runway while braking for arrival at 3:30 PM. It was flying from San Antonio de Tachira with 44 people. No one was killed or injured.
 On 16 May 2021 a TAP cargo flight to Lisbon, Portugal was prevented from departing after the Bolivarian National Guard (GNB) identified 124 bars of cocaine in the fuselage. A GNB sergeant fled the scene when the drugs were discovered.

In popular culture 
The airport is shown in the 1981 movie Menudo: La Película, when a pair of Menudo's friends board a flight during the film's final scenes. The airport is also shown in the 1975 French film Le Sauvage starring Catherine Deneuve and Yves Montand, as several soap-opera and movie key scenes were filmed at the airport.

See also 
 Los Roques Airport – an airport serving Los Roques archipelago national park, remotely controlled from Simón Bolívar International Airport
 List of airports in Venezuela
 List of airlines of Venezuela

References

External links 
 
 
 

Airports in Venezuela
Transport in Caracas
Airports established in 1945
1945 establishments in Venezuela
Buildings and structures in Vargas (state)